Morgan Kane is a fictional western character and antihero, created by Kjell Hallbing under the pseudonym Louis Masterson.

The Morgan Kane series has become the biggest success in modern Norwegian leisure reading literature. The 83 books in the series have sold 11 million copies in Norway alone, in addition to having been published in ten other countries - totalling 20 million copies sold.

Since 2011, the Morgan Kane series has been available also in the shape of eBooks published by WR Entertainment.

The first book, Without Mercy, was published in 1966, and the series is currently on sale in its 15th print edition. The current print edition is published by Aller Forlag.

The Life of Morgan Kane
Morgan Kane was born in 1855, somewhere along the Santa Fe Trail.  His parents, Brendan and Gwen Cairn were Irish immigrants - they were killed by an Indian attack when Morgan was two weeks old.

Only 16 years old, Kane kills for the first time when he stabs Walsh, a drifter who contributed to the death of his parents.  In 1874, he became a scout for the cavalry and fought in the Indian wars.  He left the Army and tried prospecting for gold in South Dakota without much luck and he enlisted in the cavalry again, serving under General Custer.  He fought in the Battle of the Little Bighorn, where General Custer was killed.  Soon after the Sioux victory at Little Big Horn, Kane left the cavalry and became a gunslinger, riding with Billy the Kid and his gang of outlaws. Leaving the gang Kane maintained himself as a bounty hunter.

By the end of the 1870s, Kane used the nickname "El Gringo" as a gunfighter in the Arizona, New Mexico and Sonora, Mexico territories, where he joined up with a gang controlled by "El Coyote".  After a battle with El Coyote, he left the gang and in 1881 was recruited by the Texas Rangers.  He joined the Texas Rangers, and in 1882, he met his future wife, Linda Swift. He was subsequently appointed a U.S. Marshal.

After meeting Linda Swift again while on a mission, Kane eventually married her. He turned in his U.S. Marshal star and settled down to raise horses on his own ranch.

After two years of marriage, Linda was murdered, and Kane set out to find his wife's killers.  He returned to serve as a U.S. Marshal, fighting many historic gunslingers including the Clanton, Johnny Ringo, Dalton Brothers, Marion Hedgepeth, John Wesley Hardin, The Wild Bunch, Sam Carey and Tom Horn. However soon Kane's superiors worried about his use of extreme violence, his excessive consumption of alcohol and at times, his mental disturbance, and his uncontrolled rage. By the close of the 1890s, he was transferred to Alaska, and was later fired.

After being fired, Kane traveled the U.S., having many different jobs, including a job as a special agent and bodyguard for Theodore Roosevelt.  Kane was also involved in the invasion of Cuba. After that Kane is set to hunt for The Wild Bunch and ends up collaborating with Butch Cassidy and Sundance Kid instead of arresting them.  Kane's health began to decline, and in 1910 he supported and fought with Pancho Villa during the Mexican Civil War. It was here that he met his unknown son, "Diablito", Paco Galàn. Together they traveled to Europe where Diablito became a famous matador. Later, Kane traveled back to America, where he was again reinstated as a U.S. Marshal.

In the last book Louis Masterson wrote, Kane was shot and killed by enemies in a deserted city on the Mexican border, facing overwhelming odds.

Characteristics 
,
The books depict Morgan Kane as a womanizing character with sociopathic tendencies, with a star-shaped scar and damage to tendons which has paralyzed the ringfinger on his gun hand. The paralyzed finger is fixed to his middle finger with a leather strap.

 Born: Autumn 1855, somewhere along the Santa Fe Trail
 Height: 6 feet 3-4 inches (192 cm)
 Weight: About 165 pounds (75 kg)
 Hair: Dark, a white streak of dead hair on right temple
 Eyes: Smoke grey
 His clothing emphasizes function and practicality before style or image. In town, he prefers dark suits with long jackets, covering his gun holster.
 Handsome with distinct features
 Unshaven and suntanned
 Wears a single gun holster
 Draws his gun in 0.4 seconds (two-fifths of a second)
 Weaknesses: women, alcohol and gambling
 Weapons: Numerous, including the Colt Paterson, Walker Colt, .45 Colt Peacemaker,  Smith & Wesson No. 3 Revolver, 1873 Winchester rifle and Krag–Jørgensen rifle.

Books

English language print books
These books were published by English publisher Corgi starting in 1971:

1.	Without Mercy	
2.	The Claw of the Dragon	
3.	The Star and the Gun	
4.	Backed by the Law	
5.	A Ranger's Honor	
6.	Marshal and Murderer	
7.	Pistolero	
8.	The Monster from Yuma	
9.	The Devil's Marshal	
10.	Gunman's Inheritance	
11.	Revenge	
12.	Storm over Sonora	
13.	The Law of the Jungle	
14.	No Tears for Morgan Kane	
15.	Between Life and Death		
16.	Return to Action	
17.	Rio Grande	
18.	Bravado	
19.	The Gallows Express	
20.	Ransom	
21.	The Butcher from Guerrero	
22.	Killing for the Law	
23.	Duel in Tombstone	
24.	To the Death, Senor Kane!	
25.	Hell Below Zero	
26.	Coyoteros	
27.	The Day of Death	
28.	Bloody Earth	
29.	New Orleans Gamble	
30.	Apache Breakout			
31.	Blood and Gold	
32.	Southern Showdown	
33.	Bell of Death	
34.	The Demon from Nicaragua	
35.	Revenging Angels	
36.	The Vultures of Sierra Madre	
37.	Dead Man's Shadow	
38.	El Gringo	
39.	El Gringo's Revenge	
40.	Harder Than Steel	
41.	Killer Kane

eBooks

1.	El Gringo	
2.	El Gringo's Revenge	
3.	Without Mercy	
4.	The Claw of the Dragon	
5.	The Star and the Gun	
6.	Backed by the Law	
7.	A Ranger's Honor	
8.	Marshal and Murderer	
9.	Pistolero	
10.	The Monster from Yuma	
11.	The Devil's Marshal	
12.	Gunman's Inheritance	
13.	Revenge	
14.	Storm over Sonora	
15.	The Law of the Jungle	

The book series has been made available as eBooks since 2011 by publishing house WR Entertainment.

Within three weeks of release, the first three ebooks held the top three best sellers on iTunes in Norway. Aftenposten's headline, "Morgan Kane makes comeback as best-seller", reported that books were being published in both English and Norwegian, with a new book being released every 2–4 weeks.

Film adaptation
In 2011 WR Entertainment acquired worldwide screen rights to adapt the Morgan Kane story for film. In 2016, it was announced Mark Huffam was attached to the film as producer.

References

External links
Links to Norwegian web sites:
«www.morgankane.no - Aller Forlag»

Links to International web sites:
Who Is Morgan Kane? - Official website for the upcoming Morgan Kane movie.
«www.facebook.com/WhoIsMorganKane» The Morgan Kane Facebook page.

Book series introduced in 1966
Literary characters introduced in 1966
Characters in novels of the 20th century
United States Marshals Service in fiction
Fictional characters of the Texas Ranger Division
Fiction set in the 19th century